Putrada Ekadashi may mean:
 Shravana Putrada Ekadashi
 Pausha Putrada Ekadashi